Emanuel Reynoso (born 16 November 1995), sometimes known as Bebelo, is an Argentine professional footballer who plays as an attacking midfielder for Major League Soccer club Minnesota United.

Career
In February 2018, Reynoso signed with Boca Juniors.

On 1 September 2020, Reynoso signed with Minnesota United FC. He made his Minnesota United debut on 2 September 2020 against Houston Dynamo. He scored his first goal for the club on 8 November 2020 against FC Dallas. With an assist in the 67th minute of the Western Conference Finals of the 2020 MLS Cup Playoffs against Seattle Sounders FC, Reynoso set a single season MLS record with his seventh assist of the playoffs. He is also the first MLS player in league history to record multiple three-assist playoff games.

Personal life
In March 2014, Reynoso was shot in the left leg.

He was arrested on December 7, 2021, for allegedly hitting a teenager in Argentina.

Reynoso failed to report to 2023 preseason training with Minnesota United and was suspended without pay by the league on February 10, 2023.

Career statistics

Club

Honours
Boca Juniors
Primera División: 2017–18, 2019–20
Supercopa Argentina: 2018

Individual
MLS All-Star: 2022

References

External links
 

1995 births
Living people
Argentine footballers
Association football midfielders
Talleres de Córdoba footballers
Boca Juniors footballers
Argentine Primera División players
Major League Soccer players
Minnesota United FC players
Designated Players (MLS)
Argentine expatriate footballers
Argentine expatriate sportspeople in the United States
Expatriate soccer players in the United States
Footballers from Córdoba, Argentina